The Munsters' Scary Little Christmas is a 1996 American made-for-television science fiction comedy film featuring characters from the 1960s sitcom The Munsters. It featured a different cast from the original series, the 1980s revival series The Munsters Today and the previous 1995 television film Here Come the Munsters. The movie is set around Christmas time and included character actor Sandy Baron as 'Grandpa'. Baron had played Grandpa's older brother Yorga a few years previously in The Munsters Today.

Plot
The movie begins with son Eddie feeling homesick for Transylvania. Herman decides a "good old Transylvanian Christmas" is what his troubled son needs to get in the mood for the holidays. Together with the family - including Lily, Grandpa and Marilyn, he sends out invitations to the entire Munster family, including Wolfman, Mummy, and the Gill-Man. Herman also asks for a raise from his boss and is fired, taking on other jobs such as modeling nude for an art class, donating blood, and wrapping presents. Meanwhile on Christmas Eve's eve, one of Grandpa's experiments has gone awry, accidentally transporting Santa Claus and his elves to the Munster Mansion. Christmas faces ruin as there is no way to send Santa home, and the entire family must find a way to save Christmas. Meanwhile, Marilyn falls in love and Lily enters a home decorating contest, with nosy neighbour Edna Dimitty (from the previous Munster movie Here Come the Munsters) causing trouble. Eddie also faces trouble at school from bullies.

Cast

Main cast
 Sam McMurray as Herman Munster
 Ann Magnuson as Lily Munster
 Bug Hall as Eddie Munster
 Sandy Baron as Grandpa
 Elaine Hendrix as Marilyn

Guest cast
 Mary Woronov as Mrs. Edna Dimwitty
 Ed Gale as Larry
 Arturo Gil as Lefty
 Mark Mitchell as Santa Claus
 Jeremy Callaghan as Tom
 John Allen as Mr. Pawlikowski
 Noel Ferrier as Door Knocker 
 Bruce Spence as Mr. Gateman
 Kate Fischer as Pretty Girl in Bar
 Patricia Howson as Mrs. Matagrano
 Dominic Condon as Spooky Onlooker 1
 Jonathan Biggins as Spooky Onlooker 2
 Alan Zitner as Cop
 Daniel Kellie as Glen
 Michael Hamilton as Hector Barbieri
 Malcolm Mudway as Burly Biker
 Donald Cook as Quasimoto, the Hunchback
 William Ten Eyck as Biker
 David Jobling as Art Teacher

Production

Filming
The movie was shot at Heathcote Hall, a historic building built in 1887 at Heathcote, New South Wales.

Broadcast
The Munsters' Scary Little Christmas was originally aired on Fox on December 17, 1996. It was acquired by ABC Family, and was added to their 25 Days of Christmas line-up on December 15, 2009. It had been previously shown on the cable network Fox Family Channel, which was later renamed ABC Family.

Home media 
It was later released on DVD by Universal Studios on November 6, 2007.

References

External links
 

1996 television films
1996 films
1990s science fiction comedy films
American Christmas films
The Munsters films
Christmas television films
American science fiction comedy films
Fox network original films
Films produced by John Landis
Films shot in New South Wales
American science fiction television films
Films directed by Ian Emes
1990s English-language films
1990s American films
Santa Claus in film